Son Sann (5 October 191119 December 2000) was a Cambodian politician and anti-communist resistance leader who served as the 22nd Prime Minister of Cambodia (1967–68) and later as President of the National Assembly (1993). A devout Buddhist, he was married and fathered seven children. His full honorary title is "Samdech Borvor Setha Thipadei Son Sann".

Early life
Son Sann was born at Phnom Penh in 1911. Son Sann's family was of Khmer Krom background; both of his parents came from wealthy landowning families in Trà Vinh Province, Vietnam. Son Sann's father, Son Sach moved to Cambodia prior to Son Sann's birth to serve as an official for Sisowath Souphanouvong, a brother of King Monivong. Son Sann studied in Phnom Penh and later Paris, where he graduated from the École des Hautes Études Commerciales in 1933. He briefly spent time in London, learning English in the process. Having returned to Cambodia in 1935 he joined the Civil Service, serving in the provinces of Prey Veng and later Battambang where he was in charge of trade. Son Sann was also a member of a Cambodian economic mission to Tokyo in 1941.

Political career

An early supporter of the Khmer Democratic Party, Son Sann became a member of its steering committee. He served as the vice-president of the Council of Ministers and Minister of Finance in the Sisowath Youtévong government from 1946-47. Following the death of Youtévong he retained his post as vice-president of the council of ministers (effectively Deputy Premier) until February 1948 and in 1949, he was the vice chairman of the Council of Ministers. He became Foreign Minister in June 1950-March 1951. Following the "crushing" of the Democrat Party in 1952, he resigned from the leadership of the party. He re-entered politics as a member of the Sangkum party and served in several governments in the late 1950s to the early 1960s holding various posts before becoming president of the National Bank of Cambodia (1955–1968).

House arrest and France

Following the 1970 coup against Prince Norodom Sihanouk, Son Sann was placed under house arrest and later left for France. In June 1970 he went to Beijing to attempt a reconciliation between Sihanouk and Lon Nol, who had overthrown him. He continued with these efforts even after the October proclamation of the Khmer Republic and by late 1971 he had gained the support of politicians and diplomats in Cambodia, France and China. However, in 1972 the Chinese Premier Zhou Enlai denounced the initiative and Lon Nol responded by naming himself President of the Khmer Republic.

Return to Cambodia

In 1978, he formed the Khmer People's National Liberation Front (KPNLF) to unite anti-communist refugees on the Thai-Cambodia border following the 1978 Vietnamese invasion of Cambodia. The KPNLF later joined with the Armeè Nationale Sihanouk to form the non-communist resistance and in 1982, the KPNLF joined with Sihanouk and the Party of Democratic Kampuchea to form the Coalition Government of Democratic Kampuchea. Son Sann was named Prime Minister in the new coalition government.

United States support

In the late 1980s and early 1990s, Son Sann drew some limited military and financial support from the United States, which sought to assist his movement as part of the Reagan Doctrine effort to counter Soviet and Vietnamese involvement in Cambodia.  One of the Reagan Doctrine's principal architects, The Heritage Foundation's Michael Johns, visited with Sonn Sann and KPNLF forces in Cambodia in 1987, and returned to Washington urging expanded U.S. support for the KPNLF and the resistance forces of Norodom Sihanouk as a third alternative to both the Vietnamese-installed and supported Cambodian government and the Khmer Rouge, which also was resisting the government. The U.S. responded by providing limited military and humanitarian aid to the Sonn Sann and Sihanouk resistance forces in Cambodia in an effort to pressure the Vietnamese to leave Cambodia and also to build a non-communist opposition alternative to the Khmer Rouge.

Following Cambodia's Paris Peace Agreement, Son Sann formed a new political party, the Buddhist Liberal Democratic Party in 1992 and participated in the 1993 elections. Son Sann was elected along with nine other members of the party and served as a minority member in the coalition government. He was President of the National Assembly from June to October 1993.

In 1997, Son Sann left Cambodia again for Paris, where he remained with his family until his death from heart failure, on 19 December 2000, at 89 years of age.

Honour

Foreign honour
  : Honorary Commander of the Order of the Defender of the Realm (1963)

References

Bibliography

|-

|-

|-

|-

|-

1911 births
2000 deaths
20th century in Cambodia
20th-century Cambodian politicians 
Buddhist Liberal Democratic Party politicians
Sangkum politicians 
Cambodian emigrants to France 
Cambodian expatriates in France 
Cambodian anti-communists 
Cambodian nationalists
Finance ministers of Cambodia 
Foreign ministers of Cambodia
Government ministers of Cambodia
Governors of the National Bank of Cambodia
Cambodian Buddhists
Khmer Krom people
People from Phnom Penh
Presidents of the National Assembly (Cambodia)
Members of the National Assembly (Cambodia) 
Prime Ministers of Cambodia
HEC Paris alumni